Ngassam Nana Falemi (born May 5, 1974) is a former Cameroonian-Romanian footballer who played as a defensive midfielder.

International career
Nana Falemi played five games at international level for Cameroon, making his debut on 27 March 2003 when he came as a substitute and replaced Bill Tchato in a friendly which ended with a 2–0 victory against Madagascar. His following two appearances were a 0–0 against United States in the group stage and a 1–0 victory against Colombia in the semifinals of the 2003 FIFA Confederations Cup where Cameroon reached the final, but lost it with 1–0 in front of France as Falemi did not play in it. His last two games for the national team were friendlies, a 0–0 against Japan and a 3–0 loss against Bulgaria, he was also part of Cameroon's squad at the 2004 African Cup of Nations but did not play in any game.

Honours
Steaua București
Divizia A: 2000–01, 2004–05
Supercupa României: 2001
Cameroon
FIFA Confederations Cup runner-up: 2003

References

External links

Living people
1974 births
Association football midfielders
Romanian footballers
Cameroonian footballers
Cameroon international footballers
Romanian expatriate footballers
Cameroonian expatriate footballers
Footballers from Bucharest
N'Gassam, Nana Falemi
FC Petrolul Ploiești players
CS Gaz Metan Mediaș players
FC Vaslui players
FC Volyn Lutsk players
Romanian expatriate sportspeople in China
Romanian expatriate sportspeople in Ukraine
Romanian expatriate sportspeople in Greece
Cameroonian expatriate sportspeople in China
Cameroonian expatriate sportspeople in Ukraine
Cameroonian expatriate sportspeople in Greece
Ergotelis F.C. players
2003 FIFA Confederations Cup players
2004 African Cup of Nations players
Liga I players
Liga II players
Ukrainian Premier League players
China League One players
Jiangsu F.C. players
Expatriate footballers in China
Expatriate footballers in Ukraine
Expatriate footballers in Greece
Romanian people of Cameroonian descent
Citizens of Cameroon through descent
Cameroonian people of Romanian descent